State Road 222 (SR 222) is a 14.174-mile-long state road that serves northern Gainesville.  The western terminus is at a diamond interchange with I-75 at exit 390, and the eastern terminus is at a fork at SR 26 just east of Gainesville.

It is 4 lanes wide, but narrows to 2 lanes east of Airport Access Road, where it runs along the northwestern edges of the Newnans Lake State Forest followed by the Newnans Lake Conservation Area.  At its western terminus, NW 39th Avenue continues west as two lane County Road 222 towards CR 241, a long county road.

Major intersections

References

External links

222
222
222